The Holocaust Memorial for the Commonwealth of Pennsylvania is a Holocaust memorial at Front and Sayford Streets along Riverfront Park, in Harrisburg, Pennsylvania.  It was conceived by a committee of Holocaust survivors in 1992 representing the Jewish Community Center of Harrisburg.  In light of publicity given to the U.S. Holocaust Museum, a group of survivors that had lived in the Harrisburg area pressed for a local memorial.  It was designed by  David Ascalon for $200,000 on a site designated by the City of Harrisburg along the public park land adjacent to the Susquehanna River.  The Memorial was dedicated in 1994. An annual Yom Hashoah observance is held at the site.

References

External links
 Holocaust Memorial for the Commonwealth of Pennsylvania by Ascalon Studios

Holocaust memorials
Outdoor sculptures in Harrisburg, Pennsylvania
Monuments and memorials in Harrisburg, Pennsylvania
Steel sculptures in Pennsylvania
1994 sculptures
1994 establishments in Pennsylvania